Tibor Scitovszky de Nagykér (21 June 1875 – 12 April 1959) was a Hungarian politician who served as Minister of Foreign Affairs between 1924 and 1925. He started his career in the Ministry of Trade after attending the university in Budapest and Paris. During the Treaty of Trianon he participated in the peace negotiations. He was the chairman of the Magyar Általános Hitelbank from 1944. When the communist regime nationalized the banks Scitovszky left the country and emigrated to the United States.

References

Further reading
 Magyar Életrajzi Lexikon

1875 births
1959 deaths
People from Nógrád County
Foreign ministers of Hungary
Tibor 01
Hungarian emigrants to the United States